is a private women's junior college in Nagano, Nagano, Japan established in 1967. The predecessor of the school was founded in 1925.

External links
 Official website 

Educational institutions established in 1925
Private universities and colleges in Japan
Universities and colleges in Nagano Prefecture
Nagano (city)
Japanese junior colleges
1925 establishments in Japan
Women's universities and colleges in Japan